Apaidia barbarica is a moth of the family Erebidae first described by Henry Legrand in 1939. It is found in Italy.

References

Moths described in 1998
Lithosiina
Moths of Europe